Alfred Kästner (12 December 1882 – 12 April 1945) was a German communist and resistance fighter against Nazism.

Biography
Kästner was born in Leipzig. He was a wood merchant by profession, and a member of the Spartacus League. In November 1918, during the German Revolution, he was elected to the Leipzig Workers' and Soldiers' Council. Kästner was also a founding member of the Leipzig branch of the Communist Party of Germany (KPD) in 1919. When the KPD was banned in 1923–1924, underground meetings were held in Kästner's office.

After the Nazi Party came to power in 1933, Kästner's office was once again used for underground gatherings of KPD activists from Leipzig as well as nearby towns such as Chemnitz, Dresden and Riesa, and for printing illegal pamphlets.

Kästner was arrested in September 1933; although he was sentenced to two years and eight months' imprisonment, he was interned in the concentration camps Sachsenburg, Sachsenhausen and Buchenwald until 1939.

After his release, Kästner joined the resistance group around Georg Schumann and maintained contact with resistance fighters in Hamburg, Bavaria and Württemberg.

Kästner was arrested again by the Gestapo on 11 March 1945.

The street in the Südvorstadt borough of Leipzig where Alfred Kästner lived was renamed Alfred-Kästner-Straße on 1 August 1945.

References

1882 births
1945 deaths
Politicians from Leipzig
Communist Party of Germany politicians
Communists in the German Resistance
Deaths by firearm in Germany
Executed communists in the German Resistance
People from Saxony executed by Nazi Germany
People of the German Revolution of 1918–1919
Sachsenhausen concentration camp prisoners
People executed by Nazi Germany by firearm